Ron Mandos is a Dutch art promoter. After a career in flowers, he founded Galerie Ron Mandos, which is called a ‘classic high end gallery’.

Based in Amsterdam, Galerie Ron Mandos represents international contemporary artists such as Hans Op de Beeck, Isaac Julien, Anthony Goicolea, Daniel Arsham, Mohau Modisakeng, Troika, Jacco Olivier, Levi van Veluw and Erwin Olaf. The gallery scouts Dutch art academies in search of new talent.

Biography 
He ended up owned several flower shops in the city centre.

In 1995 Mandos decided to sell his flower shops to travel around the world. During a stay in Madrid he visited the Museo Nacional Centro de Arte Reina Sofía, where he re-encountered his passion for art. After experiencing Stendhal Syndrome in front of Pablo Picasso’s Guernica there, he decided to pursue a career in the arts in order to share art's unique transcending ability.

Galerie Ron Mandos 

In 1998 Mandos opened an art gallery adjacent to his house, inspired by Jan Hoet’s Chambres d’Amis. He staged exhibitions with local artists such as Ine Lamers, Katinka Lampe en Joep van Lieshout. The gallery soon expanded in order to represent international artists and received national and international recognition through the participation in art fairs such as Art Forum Berlin, Art Brussels, The Armory Show NY, ARCO Madrid, LOOP Barcelona, FIAC Paris and UNTITLED ART, Miami Beach.

In 2006 Galerie Ron Mandos relocated to Amsterdam to be able to organise more large-scale exhibitions. Around this time the gallery started to represent internationally acclaimed artists like Isaac Julien and Hans Op de Beeck. Since 2008 the gallery annually programs Best of Graduates: an exhibition showing a selection of works by recent graduates of Dutch art academies. In 2016, Galerie Ron Mandos was shortlisted for an International Association of Art Critics award.

Ron Mandos Young Blood Foundation 
In 2018 Mandos founded the Ron Mandos Young Blood Foundation. It provides a platform for young artists at the start of their careers with the annual Best of Graduates exhibition and the Ron Mandos Young Blood Talent Award. The Ron Mandos Young Blood Foundation regularly stages exhibitions with work by selected Best of Graduates alumni.

References

External links 
 Galerie Ron Mandos Official website
 Young Blood Foundation Official website

Dutch art dealers
1961 births
Living people
Art in Amsterdam
Amsterdam